Jericho Dam is a combined concrete gravity and earth-fill type dam located on the Mpama River, near Amsterdam, Mpumalanga, South Africa. It was established in 1966/68 and its primary purpose is to serve for municipal and industrial use.

See also
List of reservoirs and dams in South Africa
List of rivers of South Africa

See also 

 The Department of Water Affairs

Dams in South Africa
Dams completed in 1966